"Lafayette Blues" is the second 7" single of the Detroit-based American garage rock band The White Stripes. It is backed with "Sugar Never Tasted So Good", a song that later appeared on the band's eponymous debut album The White Stripes.

In October 1998, 1,000 copies of the single were released on white vinyl. In 2001, a second edition of 1,000 black vinyl were released. Today, it is scarce and obtains high prices on auction websites like eBay. Many copies of White Blood Cells, The White Stripes' third album, were packaged with a bonus DVD which featured an audio track of "Lafayette Blues" (as well as "Hand Springs").

The lyrics of "Lafayette Blues" are a list of French names of streets in the band's hometown, Detroit, Michigan. Live performances of "Lafayette Blues" contain various arrangements of the names.

Track listing

Media links
Live recording of "Lafayette Blues", Texas, 2001
Live recording of "Sugar Never Tasted So Good", California, 2001

References 
White Stripes.net. Retrieved January 1, 2006.
White Stripes.net FAQ. Retrieved January 1, 2006.

1998 singles
Blues songs
The White Stripes songs
1998 songs
Songs written by Jack White
Songs about military officers
Cultural depictions of Gilbert du Motier, Marquis de Lafayette
Wikipedia requested audio of songs